Mud Pond is a small lake east of the hamlet of Bull Hill in Herkimer County, New York. Little Metcalf Lake is located north of Mud Lake.

See also
 List of lakes in New York

References 

Lakes of New York (state)
Lakes of Herkimer County, New York